James Roy Ozanne (June 30, 1882 – January 11, 1963) was an All-American basketball player at the University of Chicago in 1904–05. He was part of the first group of college basketball players to be honored as such. The Helms Athletic Foundation, which began in 1936, retroactively named the All-American teams from 1905 to 1935. Between 1905 and 1929, the Helms All-American teams are considered to be consensus selections.

References

1882 births
1963 deaths
All-American college men's basketball players
Basketball players from Illinois
Chicago Maroons men's basketball players
American men's basketball players